Crown Arun was a  cargo ship which was built by Actien-Gesellschaft „Neptun“ Schiffswerft und Maschinenfabrik, Rostock as Hannah Böge. She was captured at sea on 3 September 1939 and declared a war prize.

History
Hannah Böge was built for Reederei Johann M. K. Blumenthal, Hamburg. She was yard number 477, and was completed in March 1938. Her port of registry was Hamburg.

On 26 August 1939, Hannah Böge departed Shediac, New Brunswick, bound for Germany. On 1 September 1939, Germany invaded Poland, starting the western portion of the Second World War. As a result, on 3 September, the United Kingdom declared war on Germany. She was carrying a cargo of wood pulp. At the time of her capture, the crew were trying to disguise Hannah Böge although she was still flying the German flag. She was escorted to Kirkwall, Orkney Islands, where she arrived on 5 September.

After she was declared a prize of war, Hannah Böge was renamed Crown Arun and taken into service. Ownership was assigned to the Ministry of Shipping and she was placed under the management of Christian Salvesen Ltd, of Leith. Her port of registry was changed to London. Crown Arun was a member of a number of convoys.

ON 14
Convoy ON 14 departed the Methil Roads on 17 February 1940 bound for Norway. It diverted to Kirkwall on 18 February owing to a lack of cover. The convoy departed Kirkwall on 20 February and arrived in Norway on 22 February.

OB 151
Convoy OB 151 departed Liverpool on 21 May and dispersed at sea on 22 May. Crown Arun was carrying a cargo of coal from Glasgow to Montreal.

SHX 71 / HX 71 
Convoy HX 71 departed Halifax, Nova Scotia, on 5 September and arrived at Liverpool on 20 September. Convoy SHX 71 departed Sydney, Nova Scotia, on 6 September and was to join HX 71 at sea. Crown Arun was part of this convoy. SHX 71 joined with HX 71 by midday on 8 September, although Crown Arun was straggling behind by this time. Crown Arun was carrying a cargo of 2,800 tons of pit props from Gaspé, Quebec, destined for Hull. At 08:32 German time (07:32 British Time) on 17 September, Crown Arun was torpedoed north of Rockall by  under the command of Otto Kretschmer. She was finished off by gunfire. Tragically, the departure of the Winchelsea from Convoy OB 213 to protect HX 71, resulted in the torpedoing of the SS City of Benares, which sank in 31 minutes, with the loss of 258 people of 406 on board, including 81 out of 100 children, 35 of 55 women, and 142 of 251 men.

Description and propulsion
The ship was a  cargo ship.

Official Number and code letters
Official Numbers were a forerunner to IMO Numbers.

Hannah Böge used the Code Letters DJVX. Crown Arun had the UK Official Number 167367 and used the Code Letters GBJK.

See also
Empire ship

References

Ships built in Rostock
1938 ships
Steamships of Germany
Merchant ships of Germany
World War II merchant ships of Germany
Maritime incidents in September 1939
Steamships of the United Kingdom
World War II merchant ships of the United Kingdom
Maritime incidents in September 1940
Ships sunk by German submarines in World War II
World War II shipwrecks in the Atlantic Ocean